Huma Saleem Qureshi (born 28 July 1986) is an Indian actress, model and producer who primarily appears in Hindi language films. She has also received three Filmfare Award nominations. Qureshi obtained a bachelor's degree in History—with honours—from the University of Delhi, while she worked as a theatre actor and model. After working in several theatrical productions, she moved to Mumbai and signed a two-year contract with Hindustan Unilever to appear in television commercials. During the shoot for a Samsung mobile commercial, Anurag Kashyap noticed her acting ability and signed her for a three-film deal with his company.

Qureshi made her film debut with a supporting role in the two-part 2012 crime drama Gangs of Wasseypur. Her performance in the film earned her several nominations, including the Filmfare Award for Best Female Debut and the Best Supporting Actress. That same year, she played the lead female role in the romance Luv Shuv Tey Chicken Khurana, and followed it with a role in Ek Thi Daayan.

She portrayed protagonists in the anthological Shorts (2013), protagonist in the black comedy Dedh Ishqiya (2014), and supporting roles in the revenge drama Badlapur (2015) and the Marathi road drama Highway (2015). Qureshi's later roles included in films like Jolly LLB 2 (2017) and Dobaara: See Your Evil (2017). She made her web series debut with the 2019 dystopian drama Leila. Huma was praised for portrayal of the character of Rani Bharti in SonyLiv web series Maharani.

Early life and education
Qureshi was born on 28 July 1986 into a Muslim family in New Delhi, India. Her father, Saleem Qureshi, is a restaurateur who runs a chain of 10 restaurants (Saleem's); her mother, Ameena Qureshi (a Kashmiri), is a housewife. She has three brothers, including actor Saqib Saleem. The family relocated to Kalkaji, South Delhi, when Qureshi was a child. She completed her bachelor's in History with Honours from the Gargi College—University of Delhi. Later, she joined Act 1 theatre group and performed in a few theatre productions. N. K Sharma was her mentor and acting teacher during her theatre days. She has worked with several NGOs and assisted a documentary filmmaker.

Acting career

Television advertisements
In 2008, she moved to Mumbai to audition for film roles, auditioning for a film, Junction, which was never made: "I never thought of coming to Mumbai or being an actress. But when my friend called me for an audition for a movie called Junction, it set me thinking. Sadly, the film never got made". Qureshi signed a two-year contract with Hindustan Unilever to appear in their television commercials. She promoted a range of products, including Samsung Mobile (with Aamir Khan), Nerolac (with Shah Rukh Khan), Vita Marie, Saffola oil, Mederma cream and Pears soap. During a shoot for a Samsung Mobile commercial, director Anurag Kashyap was impressed with her acting ability and promised to use her in a film. Qureshi recalled: "I didn't believe him then. You hear lots of such stories in this industry, so I wasn't waiting with bated breath". Kashyap kept his promise, though, signing her for a three-film deal with his company Anurag Kashyap Films.

Film debut and breakthrough
Qureshi was initially scheduled to make her film debut with Billa II, a Tamil gangster-thriller, directed and produced by Chakri Toleti, after surviving an audition out of 700 candidates. Although cast as the female lead, when the film was delayed, Qureshi left the project to honour other work commitments. When asked whether she had any regrets, she said: "I have no regrets. I wish it had worked out, but it didn't. I am not someone who sits and laments over things. I was approached for several other south films too, but the roles weren't what I was looking for".

Qureshi made her feature film debut with a supporting role in Anurag Kashyap's critically acclaimed two-part crime drama Gangs of Wasseypur – Part 1 (2012), where Qureshi was cast as the supportive wife of a criminal (played by Nawazuddin Siddiqui). She described her character as a small-town airhead who thinks she is the prettiest girl in the village: "Mohsina tries to copy everything she sees on the big screen in her own little ways. She is heavily influenced by Bollywood". The film premiered at the 65th Cannes Film Festival, and both the film and Qureshi received positive reviews from critics. Govind Nihalani noted her screen presence, comparing the actress to Smita Patil: "an earthiness, sincerity, intensity and warmth of personality, qualities that distinguished Smita, apart from the fact that she was a very fine and instinctive actress. Huma is a good enough actress on her own, someone who can stand apart from the crowd and hold her own". Taran Adarsh of Bollywood Hungama noted: "Huma Qureshi, who's introduced much later in the film...is wonderful". The Express Tribune added: "When it comes to looks, [Huma] is different from the typical Bollywood actors". In 2012, Qureshi was ranked third, the highest female position, on Rediff.com's annual list of "Bollywood's Top Ten Debutants" (male and female). Following the success of the first part, she reprised her role of Mohsina in the second instalment of the Gangs of Wasseypur series, Gangs of Wasseypur – Part 2. The film premiered in the Cannes Directors' Fortnight at the Cannes Film Festival with its prequel. It opened to wide critical acclaim, and her portrayal again received positive reviews. Madhureeta Mukherjee of The Times of India said: "Huma Qureshi, with her gaudy clothes, designer sun-glasses and unusual attractiveness is the hottest cheez in Wasseypur. She beautifully lends support as a powerful man's 'prouder' better-half, even in his worst crimes", and Taran Adarsh found her "simply fantastic". Both films earned her Best Female Debut and Best Supporting Actress nominations at several award ceremonies (including the Filmfare Award). Qureshi described Gangs of Wasseypur as a "life-changing film".

That same year, Qureshi completed her three-film contract with Anurag Kashyap Films by starring in Luv Shuv Tey Chicken Khurana, a romantic comedy, which describes a quest for an ancient family dish; Chicken Khurana. Directed by Sameer Sharma, she played the role of a feisty Punjabi girl, Harman (star Kunal Kapoor's love interest). The film was a financial success, and Rediff.com noted that "Huma Qureshi looks right for the role and she delivers a wonderful performance". Aniruddha Guha of the Daily News and Analysis said: "[Qureshi], on the other hand, is charming as the fiery Punjaban, Harman. Her refreshingly natural acting style impresses again in a role that has shades of her character in Gangs of Wasseypur". However, Anupama Chopra found her performance to be "a little bland".

Further works (2013–present)

For her next feature, Qureshi was cast as a witch in the supernatural thriller Ek Thi Daayan (2013), alongside Emraan Hashmi, Konkona Sen Sharma and Kalki Koechlin. Dealing with the themes of witchcraft, the film was based on 'Mobius Trips', a short story written by Konkona Sen Sharma's father. It received mixed reviews from critics, but proved to be a profitable venture at the box office. Qureshi's performance was also well received. The Indian Express said: "Qureshi has just a few good moments, but makes the most of them", while Koimoi noted that "Qureshi has a remarkably pleasant and confident screen presence". Raja Sen particularly praised the female cast and wrote "The three leading ladies are smashing in their roles...Each plays their given role with frighteningly good flair, and each deserves a big hand." After appearing in Ek Thi Daayan, Qureshi, along with R. Madhavan hosted the 60th ceremony of the National Film Awards, an event presented by the Directorate of Film Festivals to honor the Best Films of the year (then 2012) in the Indian cinema by the President of India. The ceremony was held on 3 May 2013, at the Vigyan Bhavan during the presidency of Pranab Mukherjee.

Shortly afterwards, Qureshi played the titular character in the short movie Sujata—released as one of the segments of Shorts, an anthology film by Anurag Kashyap. She played the eponymous lead as a young girl who is struggling to come out of the clutches of her tormenting cousin brother (played by Satya Anand). The film was screened at Indian Film Festival of Los Angeles before its release and received generally positive reviews, and Qureshi's performance was critically acclaimed and earned her a Special Mention Award at the ceremony. Her subsequent release that year included the underworld drama D-Day, in which she was featured as Zoya Rehman, an explosive R.A.W agent with an ensemble cast including Irfan Khan, Arjun Rampal, Rishi Kapoor and Shruti Haasan. During the script narration, the director Nikkhil Advani offered Qureshi the choice of which woman to play, either Suraiya (later played by Hassan) or Zoya; she decided on Zoya to expand her horizons as an actress. The film was a flop at the box office and received mixed feedback from critics, while Qureshi's performance received favourable reviews; Subhash K. Jha mentioned that Qureshi's acting is "effortlessly appealing and effective."

In 2014, Qureshi featured in Abhishek Chaubey's black comedy Dedh Ishqiya (2014), a sequel to the 2010 film Ishqiya, co-starring  Madhuri Dixit, Arshad Warsi and Naseeruddin Shah. Dedh Ishqiya was a commercial success, earning ₹270 million (US$4.1 million) in India and abroad and Qureshi received praise for her portrayal of the promiscuous companion of a con woman (played by Dixit). In a 5-star review, Raja Sen commented that "Qureshi uses her fiercely intelligent eyes to great effect", whilst Mohar Basu agreed, saying that "Huma Qureshi is brilliant and confident. The actress has in her the vivacious energy that proves her talent." Qureshi's last appearance of 2014 was Rochak Kohli's music video "Mitti Di Khusboo" with Ayushmann Khurrana. India Today noted: "The chemistry the two Ayushmann and Huma share onscreen has the raw flavor of the countryside romance".

The following year, Qureshi appeared as a prostitute in Sriram Raghavan's crime thriller Badlapur, alongside Varun Dhawan and Nawazuddin Siddiqui. Raja Sen praised her acting and wrote that she "is hauntingly good as a call-girl". The film was a commercial success, and Qureshi received the Filmfare Best Supporting Actress nomination. Umesh Kulkarni's Marathi film Highway marked her debut in Marathi cinema. It received mixed reviews from critics, and proved to be a moderate box office success. The same year, she acted in the collaborative film X: Past Is Present. It was directed by a team of eleven filmmakers with Qureshi appearing in "Knot", a segment directed by film critic Raja Sen, where she appeared alongside Anshuman Jha. 2016 marked the debut of Qureshi in Malayalam cinema with White. She starred in dual roles in the film alongside Mammootty. The film opened to generally negative reviews from critics.

Qureshi's first release of 2017 was the courtroom comedy drama Jolly LLB 2, where she appeared alongside Akshay Kumar. A sequel to the 2013 film Jolly LLB, the film received mixed reviews from critics and was a box office success. Her next film was Gurinder Chadha's British-Indian historical drama Viceroy's House. The film follows the story of Viceroy's House in 1947 during the partition of India and was screened at the 67th Berlin International Film Festival. She then appeared along with her brother Saqib Saleem in Prawaal Raman's horror film Dobaara: See Your Evil (2017), a remake of Mike Flanagan's Hollywood flick Oculus (2013). Flanagan also served as the executive producer of the film. Qureshi starred opposite Rajinikanth in the Tamil language film Kaala. It was released on 7 June 2018. In 2018 she also became the judge of the reality show India's Best Dramebaaz.

In 2019, Qureshi played the title character in the Netflix dystopian series Leila, based on the novel of the same name. Directed by Deepa Mehta, Shanker Raman and Pawan Kumar, the series premiered on 14 June 2019 to mostly positive review from critics with particular praise for Qureshi's performance. Hiba Beg of The Quint felt that Qureshi's "raw presence in the show is as real as it gets on screen." In 2021 she also featured in web series Maharani in which she played the role of Rani Bharti which was also received very well by critics and for that she received the Filmfare OTT award. Later the year. she completed an American film Army of the Dead which was her Hollywood debut. She also returned to TV and hosted the reality show Fit Fab Feast in Zee Cafe. After that she featured in Akshay Kumar's film Bell Bottom and done a second Tamil film Valimai.

In 2022 she did her third web series Mithya which was the remake of the British series Cheat. She will also seen in  Monica, O My Darling and Double XL in 2022. In April 2022, Qureshi signed to play chef Tarla Dalal in her biopic. It is produced by Ronnie Screwvala, Ashwiny Iyer Tiwari and Nitesh Tiwari, and directed by Piyush Gupta.

Personal life 
She has been in relationship with Indian Director and writer Mudassar Aziz.

Filmography

Film

All films are in Hindi unless otherwise noted

Television

Music videos

Awards and nominations

See also
 List of Indian film actresses

References

External links

 
 

1986 births
Living people
21st-century Indian actresses
Indian film actresses
Actresses in Hindi cinema
Actresses from Delhi
Gargi College alumni
Actresses in Malayalam cinema
Actresses in Tamil cinema
Screen Awards winners